László Péter (July 8, 1929 – June 6, 2008) was Emeritus Professor of Hungarian History at the University of London. He completed his first degree at the Eötvös Loránd University of Budapest after which he worked as an archivist and teacher. He left Hungary in 1956, subsequently completing a DPhil at Nuffield College, University of Oxford under the supervision of C. A. Macartney and John Plamenatz. In 1961, he was appointed to a lectureship at SSEES and to a full chair in 1990. He retired in 1994.

László Péter published extensively on the constitutional history of Hungary and the Habsburg monarchy, mostly in the nineteenth century. He was an External Member of the Hungarian Academy of Sciences and a Fellow of University College London.

During the Hungarian Revolution of 1956, Péter was appointed to the revolutionary committee charged with the supervision and cataloguing of the archives of the Ministry of the Interior. His report on his activities, compiled shortly after his flight to the UK, is published in (eds Péter and Martyn Rady) Resistance, Rebellion and Revolution in Hungary and Central Europe: Commemorating 1956, London (UCL SSEES), 2008, pp. 321–40.

Some of Péter's most significant essays and studies were collected, edited and published in Hungary's Long Nineteenth Century: Constitutional and Democratic Traditions in a European Perspective. Collected Studies by László Péter, edited by Miklós Lojkó, Leiden and Boston: Brill, 2012. 477 pages. .

External links 
 The Times: Laszlo Peter: Hungarian historian
 "Obituary: Professor Laszlo Peter: Historian of Hungary". Independent.co.uk. Retrieved 2019-03-16.

1929 births
2008 deaths
20th-century Hungarian historians
Academics of the UCL School of Slavonic and East European Studies
Historians of Hungary
Alumni of Nuffield College, Oxford